Aucula is a genus of moths of the family Noctuidae.

Species
 Aucula azecsa Todd & Poole, 1981
 Aucula buprasium (Druce, 1897)
 Aucula byla Todd & Poole, 1981
 Aucula cerva Todd & Poole, 1981
 Aucula dita Todd & Poole, 1981
 Aucula exiva Todd & Poole, 1981
 Aucula fernandezi Todd & Poole, 1981
 Aucula fona Todd & Poole, 1981
 Aucula franclemonti Todd & Poole, 1981
 Aucula gura Todd & Poole, 1981
 Aucula hipia Todd & Poole, 1981
 Aucula ivia Todd & Poole, 1981
 Aucula jenia Todd & Poole, 1981
 Aucula josioides Walker, 1862
 Aucula kimsa Todd & Poole, 1981
 Aucula lolua Todd & Poole, 1981
 Aucula munroei Todd & Poole, 1981
 Aucula nakia Todd & Poole, 1981
 Aucula otasa Todd & Poole, 1981
 Aucula psejoa Todd & Poole, 1981
 Aucula sonura Todd & Poole, 1981
 Aucula tricuspia Zerny, 1916
 Aucula tusora Todd & Poole, 1981
 Aucula usara Todd & Poole, 1981

References
 Aucula at Markku Savela's Lepidoptera and Some Other Life Forms
 Natural History Museum Lepidoptera genus database

Agaristinae